In biology, an indumentum (Latin, literally: "garment") is a covering of trichomes (fine "hairs") on a plant or of bristles (rarely scales) of an insect. 

In plants, indumentum types include:
pubescent
hirsute
pilose
lanate
villous
tomentose
stellate
scabrous
scurfy

The indumentum on plants can have a wide variety of functions, including as anchorage in climbing plants (e.g., Galium aparine), in transpiration control, in water absorption (Tillandsia), the reflection of solar radiation, increasing water-repellency (e.g., in the aquatic fern Salvinia), in protection against insect predation, and in the trapping of insects (Drosera, Nepenthes, Stylosanthes). 
  
The use of an indumentum on insects can also be pollen-related, as on bees, sensory like whiskers, or for varied other uses including adhesion and poison.

See also
Glossary of botanical terms

References

External links
 Indumentum types

Plant anatomy